Moscow 24 is a Russian 24-hour TV channel, a part of the "Moscow Media" Incorporated editorial office of Moscow media sources and referred to All-Russia State Television and Radio Broadcasting Company (VGTRK). The Channel is headquartered in Moscow City with its production facilities and operations, and is available in Moscow, Moscow Region and Crimea. Promoted as the main city TV channel created to target all the citizens and visitors of Moscow interested in the news, life and opportunities of the city. About 50 percent of the content is devoted to live news broadcasting and information programs. The Channel also provides various entertainment and consumer oriented shows.

History 
Founded upon an initiative of the Government of Moscow on the basis of "Stolitsa" TV Channel (1997-2011) and launched on September 5, 2011 starting with the live presentation of the Channel to the Mayor of Moscow Sergey Sobyanin.
In 2016 the Channel marked the 5-years anniversary, announcing reality TV as the main current direction of their non-informational programming.

Current programming 

The City
Рейд
МОСКОВСКИЙ ПАТРУЛЬ (Moscow Patrol)
Вечер
Достор 24
Гост
фанимани
Спорная Территория
Специальный Репортаж
Подкаст
Factory

News, weather and traffic 
 Новостями (News): Updates every hour (every half-hour at 6-10am weekdays). The half past at other times are reviews.
 погоды (Weather): At :15 and :45 around the clock. At :45 weekdays & weekend evenings are overview for tomorrow's outlook.
 Трафик (Traffic): Airs every 15 minutes weekdays morning, it updates Moscow roads' situations.

References

External links 
 

Russian-language television stations in Russia
Television channels and stations established in 2011
2011 establishments in Russia
Mass media in Moscow